The Billion Dollar Band is a five-member African American 70's soul/funk/Rock/R&B musical group born out of Miami, Florida. As a one hit wonder group, they   were released on the Miami Criteria's Sound Studios record label, Good Sounds.

Line up
The original Billion Dollar Band members are:
 Roosevelt Demps (drummer/vocalist)
 Winston Stubbs (trumpet/vocalist)
 Reginald Showers (trombone/vocalist)
 Charles N. Harris Jr. (bassist/vocalist)
 Vernon Maddox (lead vocalist/guitarist

Discography
Their ten-song album release included the songs:
 Money Don't Grow On Trees
Get In The Groove
I Like What You're Doin'
 Candy Girl
Love's Sweet Notions
Our Love
Without Your Love
 Smiling Morning Love
 Big Time Spender
Let's Just Be Friends.

It was released worldwide on the CBS, Epic, and RCA record labels in 1978.

References

External links
www.lapellenera.blogspot.com
Good Sounds Album Discography, By Patrice Eyries, Mike Callahan, David Edwards and Randy Watts

American soul musical groups
Musical quintets
Musical groups from Miami